Fredrik Mikkelsen (born 24 October 1981 in Bergen, Norway) is a Norwegian musician and composer, playing both the traditional and lap steel guitar, within a series of genres like jazz, blues and folk, living in Copenhagen since 2008.

Career
Mikkelsen started early to play the guitar and is largely an autodidact musician. He got his formal musical training from the Music program at "Voss gymnas" (1997–2000), which gave him the fundamental tools to understand music and continue studying on his own accord. Together with friends like Isak Strand he performed on various locations and recordings within local bands, for the most part solo or duo constellations.

Mikkelsen holds a Bachelor of Nursing at Høgskolen i Bergen (2006), and during his studies he traveled to Zansibar and got influences from African musical traditions there. Later, he moved to Copenhagen, where he started playing more blues, folk and jazz inspired music with the vocalist Pernille Koch, under the name "Her Name and Mine", performing at the Dancing at Copenhagen Jazz Festival in the summer of 2013.

Discography
2012: The Oslo Recordings (Little Blue Records), within "Her Name and Mine" including vocalist Pernille Koch

References

External links
The Oslo Recordings by Her Name and Mine

Norwegian jazz guitarists
Norwegian jazz composers
Male jazz composers
Musicians from Bergen
Musicians from Copenhagen
1981 births
Living people
21st-century Norwegian guitarists
21st-century Norwegian male musicians